This is a list of electoral district results for the 1959 New South Wales state election.

Results by electoral district

Albury

Armidale

Ashfield−Croydon 

Ashfield, held by Richard Murden and Croydon, held by David Hunter were combined into one seat.

Auburn

Balmain

Bankstown

Barwon

Bathurst

Blacktown

Bondi

Bulli

Burrinjuck

Burwood

Byron

Canterbury

Casino

Castlereagh

Cessnock

Clarence

Cobar

Collaroy

Concord

Coogee

Cook's River

Cronulla 

Ian Griffith was the member for Sutherland.

Drummoyne

Dubbo

Dulwich Hill

Earlwood

East Hills

Eastwood

Fairfield

Georges River

Gloucester

Gordon

Gosford

Goulburn

Granville

Hamilton

Hartley

Hawkesbury

Hornsby

Hurstville 

Illawarra

Kahibah 

Tom Armstrong (Independent Labor) died and Jack Stewart (Labor) won the resulting by-election.

King

Kogarah

Kurri Kurri

Lake Macquarie

Lakemba

Lane Cove

Leichhardt

Lismore

Liverpool

Liverpool Plains

Maitland

Manly

Maroubra

Marrickville

Merrylands

Monaro

Mosman

Mudgee

Murray

Murrumbidgee

Nepean

Neutral Bay

Newcastle

North Sydney

Orange

Oxley

Paddington−Waverley 

The Labor held seats of Paddington and Waverley were combined into one seat.

Parramatta

Phillip

Raleigh 

The sitting member Radford Gamack had been elected as a  member, but contested this election as an independent.

Randwick

Redfern

Rockdale

Ryde

South Coast

Sturt

Sutherland 

The sitting member Ian Griffith successfully contested [[Results of the 1959 New South Wales state election#Cronulla|Cronulla]].

Tamworth

Temora

Tenterfield

Upper Hunter

Vaucluse

Wagga Wagga 

Eddie Graham died and Wal Fife won the resulting by-election.

Waratah

Willoughby

Wollondilly

Wollongong−Kembla

Woollahra

Young

See also 

 Candidates of the 1959 New South Wales state election
 Members of the New South Wales Legislative Assembly, 1959–1962

Notes

References 

1959